Bathgate Castle, near Bathgate, West Lothian, Scotland, was a motte-and-bailey castle. It was abandoned after 1327 and only the motte survives aside from some earthworks. It was designated a scheduled monument in 1961 by Historic Environment Scotland.

History
The castle was the caput of the barony of Bathgate. The castle was part of the dowry of Marjorie Bruce, daughter of King Robert the Bruce, upon her marriage to Walter, High Steward of Scotland in 1314. Walter died there in 1327, and the castle appears to have been abandoned afterwards. The remains of the castle are located within a golf course.

References

Further reading

Castles in West Lothian
Motte-and-bailey castles
House of Stuart
Bathgate